Breese may refer to:

People 
 Breese (surname)

Places 
 Breese, Germany
 Breese, Illinois, U.S.

Other uses 
 M-Squared Breese, an ultralight aircraft
 USS Breese (DD-122), a U.S. Navy destroyer

See also 
 
 Breeze (disambiguation)